The Romantic Manifesto: A Philosophy of Literature is a collection of essays regarding the nature of art by the philosopher Ayn Rand. It was first published in 1969, with a second, revised edition published in 1975. Most of the essays are reprinted from Rand's magazine The Objectivist.

Summary
At the base of her argument, Rand asserts that one cannot create art without infusing a given work with one's own value judgments and personal philosophy.  Even if the artist attempts to withhold moral overtones, the work becomes tinged with a deterministic or naturalistic message.  The next logical step of Rand's argument is that the audience of any particular work cannot help but come away with some sense of a philosophical message, colored by his or her own personal values, ingrained into their psyche by whatever degree of emotional impact the work holds for them.

Rand goes on to divide artistic endeavors into "valid" and "invalid" forms. Photography, for example, is invalid to her (qua art form) because a camera merely records the world exactly as it is and has very limited, if any, capacity to carry a moral message beyond the photographer's choice of subject matter. Art, to her, should always strive to elevate and idealize the human spirit. She specifically attacks Naturalism and Modernism in art, while upholding Romanticism (in the artistic sense, which Rand distinguishes from the philosophy also called Romanticism, which she strongly opposed).

The first eleven of the book's twelve chapters were essays originally written for periodicals and an introduction to an edition of Victor Hugo. The final chapter is a short story entitled "The Simplest Thing in the World".

Publication history
Most of the essays in the book originally appeared in The Objectivist, except for the "Introduction to Ninety-Three", which was an introduction for an English-language edition of the Victor Hugo novel. The first edition of The Romantic Manifesto was published by The World Publishing Company in 1969. It was Rand's first book to be published after her break with her former protégé Nathaniel Branden, and unlike her two previous essay collections it did not contain material by Branden or any other authors besides Rand. A paperback edition was published by New American Library in 1971. The revised edition in 1975 added the essay "Art and Cognition".

Reception
Upon its initial release, The Romantic Manifesto received only a few reviews. Most of these were brief and negative, and even the longer reviews paid little attention to the details of Rand's aesthetic theory. From then until the late 1990s, The Romantic Manifesto and Rand's aesthetic theory in general received little attention, leading Rand scholar Chris Matthew Sciabarra to refer to it as "a nearly forgotten book in the Randian canon". One of the few exceptions was a 1986 journal article by literature professor Stephen D. Cox, in which he contrasted Rand's formal aesthetic theory from the book with her own practices as an author of fiction, arguing that her practice contradicted some of her theoretical points. Another exception was a chapter on Rand's aesthetics in Objectivism: The Philosophy of Ayn Rand, a detailed presentation of her ideas by her friend and heir Leonard Peikoff. Overall this period was described by one later critic as a time of "benign neglect", when even Rand's admirers wrote little about her ideas on art.

Mimi Reisel Gladstein described the book as "perhaps the most unified and coherent of Rand's nonfiction works." However, the historian James T. Baker contrasted the book with Rand's approach in her book Introduction to Objectivist Epistemology, most of which was written as a single work. Baker described The Romantic Manifesto as lacking the "systematic" approach of the other book. Barry Vacker said that while the book "offers unique and valuable insights", it fails to "present a complete philosophy of fine art".

As of 2008, the book had sold over 350,000 copies.

References

Works cited
 
 
 
 
 
 
 
 
 

1969 non-fiction books
American essay collections
Art manifestos
Books about writing
Books by Ayn Rand
English-language books
Objectivist books
Philosophy books
New American Library books